Chromolaena borinquensis, the limestone thoroughwort, is a West Indian species of flowering shrub in the family Asteraceae. It is native to the Commonwealth of Puerto Rico, part of the United States.

The epithet borinquensis is derived from a Latinized version of the word Borikén, indigenous Taíno name for the island.

References

borinquensis
Endemic flora of Puerto Rico
Plants described in 1925
Flora without expected TNC conservation status